Carlos Pizzini (born 25 November 1941) is an Argentine gymnast. He competed in seven events at the 1964 Summer Olympics.

References

1941 births
Living people
Argentine male artistic gymnasts
Olympic gymnasts of Argentina
Gymnasts at the 1964 Summer Olympics
Place of birth missing (living people)